Light in My Darkness is a book, originally published in 1927 as My Religion, written by Helen Keller when she was 47 years old. The book was written as a tribute to Emanuel Swedenborg whom Helen regarded as "one of the noblest champions true Christianity has ever known". This book is regarded as Keller's spiritual autobiography in which she openly told that "the teachings of Emanuel Swedenborg have been my light, and a staff in my hand and by his vision splendid I am attended on my way".

The original publication was loosely put together and hastily printed by Doubleday, Page & Company. Nevertheless, it sold well in 1927 and has remained in print ever since. In 1994, Ray Silverman, a Swedenborgian minister and literary scholar, thoroughly revised and edited My Religion, organizing the eight unwieldy sections of the first edition into twelve distinct chapters with subheadings to clarify their contents. Furthermore, important materials not present in the first edition were added to elucidate and expand the original text. Other revisions included modernization of several words and phrases, substitution of inclusive language where appropriate, correction of spelling and typographical errors, alteration of punctuation to conform to modern standards, and emendation of a few historical inaccuracies. Extra paragraph breaks were added and a very few passages that distracted from the main messages were delicately pruned. 

In 2000 a second edition of Light in My Darkness was published which included an article that was originally published in Guideposts magazine in 1956, when Keller was 76 years old. The article, which was reprinted by Guideposts in 1995, is significant in that it establishes the fact that Keller was indeed a lifelong Swedenborgian. It is in this article that she writes,

Also included in the 2000 edition is a quote from Keller's last published book, Teacher (1955). In it she speaks of her undimmed enthusiasm for Swedenborg's teachings. She does this by first quoting the American poet, Walt Whitman who wrote: 
"O Spirit, as a runner strips/ Upon a windy afternoon/ Be unencumbered of what troubles you--/ Arise with grace / And greatly go, with the wind upon your face."

Keller then adds, "In that state of exhilaration I had accepted the teachings of Emanuel Swedenborg, had drunk in his interpretation of the Bible, fearless, reverent, yet as unconfined as the sun, the clouds, the sea."

The change in title from My Religion to Light in My Darkness is significant. The new title is taken from one of Keller's poetic statements in which she declares, "I know that life is given us so that we may grow in love. And I believe that God is in me as the sun is in the color and fragrance of the flower, the Light in my darkness, the Voice in my silence."

Reception 
Readers were divided by those impressed by her faith and those disappointed that the famous deafblind activist advocated Swedenborgianism rather than a more "mainstream" religion.

External links
 

1927 non-fiction books
Alabama culture
American autobiographies
Doubleday, Page & Company books
Religious autobiographies
Swedenborgianism